The IWRF European Championship or IWRF European Zone Championship is the European wheelchair rugby championships that take place every two years between national teams of the continents. The European Championship is also a qualifying tournament for the IWRF World Championships and the Paralympic Games.

The first European Championship was held in 1995.

Summaries

Championships per nation

Participation details

See also
Wheelchair Rugby World Championships
IWRF Americas Championship
IWRF Asia-Oceania Championship
European Championships

References

Nyhedsarkiv - Det danske landshold i kørestolsrugby er udtaget! (Danish), Dansk Handicap Idræts-Forbund, August 3, 2005. Retrieved 2011-01-01.
Rullstolsrugby (Swedish), rekryteringsgruppen.se
Rollstuhlrugby (German), rugby-rebels.de
1997 European Championships, United States Quad Rugby Association (USQRA)
1999 European Championship, United States Quad Rugby Association (USQRA)
The European Championship results 2003, The Gaelic Warriors

Belgium Beats Sweden at Wheelchair Rugby Championships, International Paralympic Committee (IPC), October 20, 2009
- Paraplegie 132 - WM ohne schweizer (Swiss), Schweizer Paraplegiker-Gruppe, December 2009
Calendar, International Wheelchair Rugby Federation (IWRF)

 
Europe
1995 establishments in Europe
Recurring sporting events established in 1995